Ebrahim Monshizadeh was an Iranian political activist and the founder of the Punishment Committee. He was the father of the Iranian Nazi figure Davud Monshizadeh.

Life 

Born in Yerevan in the Russian Empire, and lived there until 1889 when his father, Karim Khan Monshizadeh, moved to Iran. After moving to Iran, he studied in Dar ul-Funun, and started political activity after his father was poisoned to death by Qajar officials. He took part in the Constitutional Revolution, where he joined the constitutionalists of Gilan.

He was later arrested and exiled to Kalat-e Naderi, but was killed on the way by the order of Vosugh od-Dowleh in Damghan.

Davud Monshizadeh, founder of the far right Iranian party SUMKA was his son.

References 

Iranian revolutionaries
Politicians from Yerevan
People of the Persian Constitutional Revolution